.top is a generic top-level domain, officially delegated in ICANN's New gTLD Program on August 4, 2014.

The domain name extension .top is managed and operated by the .top registry (registry backend ZDNS) which belongs to Jiangsu Bangning Science & Technology Co., Ltd. in Nanjing, China and can be registered by anyone since November 18, 2014 without special requirements.

A second level domain under the top level domain (TLD) .top can consist of digits, letters, hyphens and specific special characters while it can have a length of 1 up to (a maximum) of 63 characters. Like most other TLDs It can be registered for a period of at least 1 year up to (a maximum) of 10 years in advance. The private registration (WHOIS privacy) of .top domains is supported as well the ability to register internationalized domain names (IDNs) which includes the character sets Arabic, Chinese (simplified & traditional), French, German, Japanese, Russian and Spanish.

Meaning 
The meaning of the word "top" (adjective) is globally recognized a synonym for "best", "high-end", "leading", "highest (rank / quality / position)", "state-of-the-art", "outstanding" etc. in a large number of (western) languages. This plus its easy spelling makes it one of the most used expressions in print / radio / TV / web when it comes to pointing out how something is valued. In opposite to the generic 3 letter TLDs .com / .net & .org which are all abbreviations that stand for "commercial" / "network" & "organization", the generic 3 letter TLD .top is a complete word, "top".

Development

 June 20, 2011, ICANN officially announced that the application for new gTLDs was to open in 2012.
 April 11, 2012, the application was submitted online. On June 9, 2012, it appeared on the ICANN public list.
 March 20, 2013, it passed initial evaluation.
 March 20, 2014, the registry signed a contract with ICANN.
 August 5, 2014, the domain entered the root zone of ICANN new gTLD.
 October 15, 2014, it entered its sunrise period.
 November 18, 2014, .top domains could be registered openly. Registration volume exceeded 10,000 on the first day.
 April 24, 2015, .top was put on record with Chinese national government department MIIT (Ministry of Industry and Information Technology).
 September 2015, .top domains obtained 250,000 new registrations within one week, making its registration volume surge to 530,000.
 December 2015, .top registration reached around 1,000,000.
 May 2022, .top registration reached around 1,900,000.

References

External links
 

Top
Computer-related introductions in 2014